The 2013 Ladbrokes World Darts Championship was the 20th World Championship organised by the Professional Darts Corporation since it separated from the British Darts Organisation. The event  took place at the Alexandra Palace, London between 14 December 2012 and 1 January 2013.

Adrian Lewis was the defending champion having won the last two editions of the tournament, but was beaten by Michael van Gerwen in the quarter-finals, thus ending Lewis' 15 match unbeaten run at the World Championship.

Phil Taylor aged 52 claimed his 16th and last World Championship title with a 7–4 victory over Michael van Gerwen in the final, despite trailing 0–2 and then 2–4 after six sets. Taylor won five sets in a row for the win. Van Gerwen averaged between 105 and 108 in the early sets but as his average never dropped, Taylor's average levelled off at 103 as did his ascendancy over a rival he admitted in the post-match interview was 'hard to crack'.

With his 2013 PDC World Championship win, Taylor became the first winner of the newly created Sid Waddell Trophy, named after the legendary darts commentator who died of bowel cancer on 11 August 2012.

Format and qualifiers
The televised stages featured 72 players. The top 32 players in the PDC Order of Merit on 26 November 2012 were seeded for the tournament. They were joined by the 16 highest non-qualified players from the Pro Tour Order of Merit, based on the 33 events played on the PDC Pro Tour.

These 48 players were joined by two PDPA qualifiers (as determined at a PDPA Qualifying event held in Barnsley on 26 November 2012), the highest ranked non-qualified player on the PDC Youth Tour Order of Merit, and 21 international players: the four highest names in the European Order of Merit not already qualified, and 17 further international qualifiers to be determined by the PDC and PDPA.

Some of the international players, such as the four from the European Order of Merit, and the top American and Australian players were entered straight into the first round, while others, having won qualifying events in their countries, were entered into the preliminary round.

Players were:

Order of Merit

Pro Tour
  Ian White
  Michael Smith
  Dean Winstanley
  James Hubbard
  Arron Monk
  Joe Cullen
  Scott Rand
  Darren Webster
  Dennis Priestley
  Johnny Haines
  Steve Brown
  James Richardson
  Peter Hudson
  Mickey Mansell
  Mark Jones
  Andy Jenkins

European Order of MeritFirst round qualifiers
  Co Stompé
  Gino Vos
  Magnus Caris
  Jerry Hendriks

PDPA QualifiersFirst round qualifier
  Stuart Kellett
Preliminary Round Qualifier
  John Bowles

PDC Youth Tour QualifierPreliminary Round Qualifier
  Jamie Lewis

International QualifiersFirst round qualifiers
  Darin Young
  Shane Tichowitsch
  Kyle Anderson

Preliminary Round Qualifiers
  Daryl Gurney
  Jani Haavisto
  Dave Harrington
  Max Hopp
  Lourence Ilagan
  Jarkko Komula
  Mohd Latif Sapup
  Leung Chen Nam
  Paul Lim
  Robert Marijanović
  Haruki Muramatsu
  Charl Pietersen
  Carlos Rodríguez
  Andree Welge

Prize money
The 2013 World Championship featured a prize fund of £1,000,000 – the same as in the previous three years.

The prize money was allocated as follows:

Draw
The draw for the Round of 64 took place on 4 December 2012, the preliminary round pairings were published on 26 November 2012.

Preliminary round
The winner played his first round match the same day.

Last 64

Final

Statistics
{|class="wikitable sortable" style="font-size: 95%; text-align: right"
|-
! Player
! Eliminated
! Played
! Sets Won
! Sets Lost
! Legs Won
! Legs Lost
! 100+
! 140+
! 180s
! High checkout
! Average
|-
|align="left"|  Phil Taylor
| Winner
| 6
| 
| 
| 
| 
| 
| 
| 
| 170
| 97.46
|-
|align="left"|  Michael van Gerwen
| Runner-up
| 6
| 
| 
| 
| 
| 
| 
| 
| 144
| 98.83
|-
|align="left"|  Raymond van Barneveld
|  Semi-final
| 5
| 
| 
| 
| 
| 
| 
| 
| 136
| 99.29
|-
|align="left"|  James Wade
|  Semi-final
| 5
| 
| 
| 
| 
| 
| 
| 
| 130
| 90.62
|-
|align="left"|  Andy Hamilton
|  Quarter-final
| 4
| 
| 
| 
| 
| 
| 
| 
| 138
| 95.84
|-
|align="left"|  Simon Whitlock
|  Quarter-final
| 4
| 
| 
| 
| 
| 
| 
| 
| 164
| 95.07
|-
|align="left"|  Wes Newton
|  Quarter-final
| 4
| 
| 
| 
| 
| 
| 
| 
| 144
| 92.70
|-
|align="left"|  Adrian Lewis
|  Quarter-final
| 4
| 
| 
| 
| 
| 
| 
| 
| 138
| 91.74
|-
|align="left"|  Terry Jenkins
|  Third round
| 3
| 
| 
| 
| 
| 
| 
| 
| 120
| 97.63
|-
|align="left"|  Robert Thornton
|  Third round
| 3
| 
| 
| 
| 
| 
| 
| 
| 150
| 96.22
|-
|align="left"|  Gary Anderson
|  Third round
| 3
| 
| 
| 
| 
| 
| 
| 
| 142
| 95.15
|-
|align="left"|  Kevin Painter
|  Third round
| 3
| 
| 
| 
| 
| 
| 
| 
| 160
| 94.40
|-
|align="left"|  Dave Chisnall
|  Third round
| 3
| 
| 
| 
| 
| 
| 
| 
| 157
| 93.41
|-
|align="left"|  Colin Lloyd
|  Third round
| 3
| 
| 
| 
| 
| 
| 
| 
| 132
| 92.79
|-
|align="left"|  Vincent van der Voort
|  Third round
| 3
| 
| 
| 
| 
| 
| 
| 
| 108
| 91.83
|-
|align="left"|  Mark Walsh
|  Third round
| 3
| 
| 
| 
| 
| 
| 
| 
| 101
| 86.91
|-
|align="left"|  Peter Wright
|  Second round
| 2
| 
| 
| 
| 
| 
| 
| 
| 141
| 95.10
|-
|align="left"|  Scott Rand
|  Second round
| 2
| 
| 
| 
| 
| 
| 
| 
| 104
| 94.01
|-
|align="left"|  Mark Webster
| |  Second round
| 2
| 
| 
| 
| 
| 
| 
| 
| 145
| 93.49
|-
|align="left"|  Colin Osborne
|  Second round
| 2
| 
| 
| 
| 
| 
| 
| 
| 164
| 92.15
|-
|align="left"|  Dean Winstanley
|  Second round
| 2
| 
| 
| 
| 
| 
| 
| 
| 141
| 91.62
|-
|align="left"|  Ronnie Baxter
|  Second round
| 2
| 
| 
| 
| 
| 
| 
| 
| 89
| 90.74
|-
|align="left"|  Paul Nicholson
|  Second round
| 2
| 
| 
| 
| 
| 
| 
| 
| 107
| 90.26
|-
|align="left"|  Daryl Gurney
|  Second round
| 3
| 
| 
| 
| 
| 
| 
| 
| 122
| 90.09
|-
|align="left"|  Brendan Dolan
|  Second round
| 2
| 
| 
| 
| 
| 
| 
| 
| 124
| 89.75
|-
|align="left"|  John Part
|  Second round
| 2
| 
| 
| 
| 
| 
| 
| 
| 127
| 89.45
|-
|align="left"|  Justin Pipe
|  Second round
| 2
| 
| 
| 
| 
| 
| 
| 
| 116
| 88.37
|-
|align="left"|  Steve Beaton
|  Second round
| 2
| 
| 
| 
| 
| 
| 
| 
| 84
| 88.15
|-
|align="left"|  John Bowles
|  Second round
| 3
| 
| 
| 
| 
| 
| 
| 
| 121
| 87.63
|-
|align="left"|  Richie Burnett
|  Second round
| 2
| 
| 
| 
| 
| 
| 
| 
| 121
| 86.17
|-
|align="left"|  Jerry Hendriks
|  Second round
| 2
| 
| 
| 
| 
| 
| 
| 
| 156
| 85.13
|-
|align="left"|  Denis Ovens
|  Second round
| 2
| 
| 
| 
| 
| 
| 
| 
| 113
| 83.22
|-
|align="left"|  Kim Huybrechts
| First round
| 1
| 
| 
| 
| 
| 
| 
| 
| 127
| 98.79
|-
|align="left"|  Jamie Caven
| First round
| 1
| 
| 
| 
| 
| 
| 
| 
| 110
| 94.15
|-
|align="left"|  Wayne Jones
| First round
| 1
| 
| 
| 
| 
| 
| 
| 
| 116
| 92.21
|-
|align="left"|  Ian White
| First round
| 1
| 
| 
| 
| 
| 
| 
| 
| 98
| 92.11
|-
|align="left"|  Shane Tichowitsch
| First round
| 1
| 
| 
| 
| 
| 
| 
| 
| 161
| 92.07
|-
|align="left"|  Mervyn King
| First round
| 1
| 
| 
| 
| 
| 
| 
| 
| 140
| 90.70
|-
|align="left"|  Arron Monk
| First round
| 1
| 
| 
| 
| 
| 
| 
| 
| 52
| 89.88
|-
|align="left"|  Jani Haavisto
| First round
| 2
| 
| 
| 
| 
| 
| 
| 
| 130
| 89.29
|-
|align="left"|  Dennis Priestley
| First round
| 1
| 
| 
| 
| 
| 
| 
| 
| 92
| 88.20
|-
|align="left"|  Mark Jones
| First round
| 1
| 
| 
| 
| 
| 
| 
| 
| 16
| 87.95
|-
|align="left"|  Michael Smith
| First round
| 1
| 
| 
| 
| 
| 
| 
| 
| 40
| 87.90
|-
|align="left"|  Joe Cullen
| First round
| 1
| 
| 
| 
| 
| 
| 
| 
| 52
| 87.89
|-
|align="left"|  Darren Webster
| First round
| 1
| 
| 
| 
| 
| 
| 
| 
| 76
| 87.60
|-
|align="left"|  Stuart Kellett
| First round
| 1
| 
| 
| 
| 
| 
| 
| 
| 84
| 87.53
|-
|align="left"|  Darin Young
| First round
| 1
| 
| 
| 
| 
| 
| 
| 
| 144
| 86.57
|-
|align="left"|  Steve Brown
| First round
| 1
| 
| 
| 
| 
| 
| 
| 
| 76
| 86.12
|-
|align="left"|  Haruki Muramatsu
| First round
| 2
| 
| 
| 
| 
| 
| 
| 
| 116
| 85.94
|-
|align="left"|  Co Stompé
| First round
| 1
| 
| 
| 
| 
| 
| 
| 
| 72
| 85.63
|-
|align="left"|  Johnny Haines
| First round
| 1
| 
| 
| 
| 
| 
| 
| 
| 95
| 84.29
|-
|align="left"|  Paul Lim
| First round
| 2
| 
| 
| 
| 
| 
| 
| 
| 170
| 83.65
|-
|align="left"|  Kyle Anderson
| First round
| 1
| 
| 
| 
| 
| 
| 
| 
| 40
| 83.63
|-
|align="left"|  Magnus Caris
| First round
| 1
| 
| 
| 
| 
| 
| 
| 
| 64
| 83.27
|-
|align="left"|  James Richardson
| First round
| 1
| 
| 
| 
| 
| 
| 
| 
| 100
| 83.26
|-
|align="left"|  Lourence Ilagan
| First round
| 2
| 
| 
| 
| 
| 
| 
| 
| 121
| 82.95
|-
|align="left"|  Max Hopp
| First round
| 2
| 
| 
| 
| 
| 
| 
| 
| 96
| 82.70
|-
|align="left"|  Peter Hudson
| First round
| 1
| 
| 
| 
| 
| 
| 
| 
| 56
| 82.57
|-
|align="left"|  Andy Smith
| First round
| 1
| 
| 
| 
| 
| 
| 
| 
| 64
| 81.81
|-
|align="left"|  Leung Chen Nam
| First round
| 2
| 
| 
| 
| 
| 
| 
| 
| 40
| 81.46
|-
|align="left"|  Gino Vos
| First round
| 1
| 
| 
| 
| 
| 
| 
| 
| 61
| 79.90
|-
|align="left"|  James Hubbard
| First round
| 1
| 
| 
| 
| 
| 
| 
| 
| 101
| 78.80
|-
|align="left"|  Mickey Mansell
| First round
| 1
| 
| 
| 
| 
| 
| 
| 
| 82
| 78.46
|-
|align="left"|  Andy Jenkins
| First round
| 1
| 
| 
| 
| 
| 
| 
| 
| 70
| 73.20
|-
|align="left"|  Jarkko Komula
| Preliminary round
| 1
| 
| 
| 
| 
| 
| 
| 
| 81
| 82.32
|-
|align="left"|  Robert Marijanović
| Preliminary round
| 1
| 
| 
| 
| 
| 
| 
| 
| 73
| 82.16
|-
|align="left"|  Carlos Rodríguez
| Preliminary round
| 1
| 
| 
| 
| 
| 
| 
| 
| 40
| 81.92
|-
|align="left"|  Jamie Lewis
| Preliminary round
| 1
| 
| 
| 
| 
| 
| 
| 
| 118
| 81.84
|-
|align="left"|  Charl Pietersen
| Preliminary round
| 1
| 
| 
| 
| 
| 
| 
| 
| 40
| 81.79
|-
|align="left"|  Andree Welge
| Preliminary round
| 1
| 
| 
| 
| 
| 
| 
| 
| 16
| 76.70
|-
|align="left"|  Mohd Latif Sapup
| Preliminary round
| 1
| 
| 
| 
| 
| 
| 
| 
| 10
| 65.58
|-
|align="left"|  Dave Harrington
| Preliminary round
| 1
| 
| 
| 
| 
| 
| 
| 
| –
| 59.36
|-

Representation from different countries
This table shows the number of players by country in the World Championship, the total number including the preliminary round.

Broadcasting

The tournament was available in the following countries on these channels.

Additionally, the semi-finals and final were broadcast in 3D in the United Kingdom and Ireland.

References

External links
Official site
Netzone; Results and Schedule

2013
World Championship
World Championship
2012 sports events in London
2013 sports events in London
2012 in British sport
2013 in British sport
December 2012 sports events in the United Kingdom
January 2013 sports events in the United Kingdom
International sports competitions in London
Alexandra Palace